Whiskey Cavalier is an American action comedy-drama television series, created by David Hemingson, that premiered on February 24, 2019. The full pilot episode debuted after the Oscars and was rebroadcast in the show’s regular time slot three nights later (February 27, 2019), on ABC. On May 12, 2019, ABC cancelled the series after one season, and the series finale aired on May 22, 2019.

Premise
Whiskey Cavalier follows the "adventures of FBI agent Will Chase (codename: Whiskey Cavalier) who, following an emotional break-up, is assigned to work with CIA operative Francesca 'Frankie' Trowbridge (codename: Fiery Tribune). Together, they lead an inter-agency team of spies who periodically save the world (and each other) while navigating the rocky roads of friendship, romance and office politics".

Cast and characters

Main
 Scott Foley as FBI Special Agent Will Chase, code named Whiskey Cavalier, former Marine and an Iraq War veteran
 Lauren Cohan as CIA agent Francesca "Frankie" Trowbridge, code named Fiery Tribune
 Ana Ortiz as FBI profiler Dr. Susan Sampson
 Vir Das as CIA agent Jai Datta
 Tyler James Williams as NSA analyst Edgar Standish
 Josh Hopkins as FBI Special Agent Ray Prince (Credited as "special guest star" for "Pilot")

Recurring
 Dylan Walsh as Alex Ollerman
 Ophelia Lovibond as Emma Davies
 Marika Domińczyk as Martyna "Tina" Marek

Guest
 Bellamy Young as Karen Pappas (in "The Czech List")
 Joe Doyle as Paul (in "Mrs. & Mr. Trowbridge" and "Czech Mate")
 Dash Mihok as Jimmy Coleman ("special guest star" in "Spain, Trains, and Automobiles")
 Ki Hong Lee as Jung (in "College Confidential")
 Christa Miller as Kelly Ashland ("special guest star" in "Two of a Kind")
 Sung Kang as Daniel Lou ("special guest star" in "Two of a Kind")

Episodes

Production

Development
On October 24, 2017, it was announced that ABC had given the production a put pilot commitment after multiple networks had shown interest. The pilot was written by David Hemingson who was expected to executive produce alongside Bill Lawrence and Jeff Ingold. Scott Foley was set to serve as a producer. Production companies involved with the pilot were slated to consist of Doozer and Warner Bros. Television. On February 16, 2018, it was announced that Peter Atencio would direct the pilot and become an executive producer. On May 11, 2018, it was announced that ABC had given the production a series order. A few days later, it was announced that the series would premiere in the spring of 2019 as a mid-season replacement.

Casting
Alongside the put pilot announcement, it was confirmed that Scott Foley would star in the series in addition to producing. In February 2018, it was announced that Lauren Cohan, Ana Ortiz, Vir Das and Tyler James Williams had joined the pilot's main cast. On August 23, 2018, it was reported that Josh Hopkins had joined the cast as a series regular after making a guest appearance in the pilot episode. On September 20, 2018, it was announced that Bellamy Young had been cast in a guest role. On December 18, 2018, it was reported that Dylan Walsh would appear in a recurring capacity. On January 25, 2019, it was announced that Foley's wife, Marika Domińczyk, and Christa Miller had joined the cast in recurring roles.

Release
On May 15, 2018, ABC released the first official trailer for the series. On December 12, 2018, it was announced that the series would premiere on February 27, 2019 and air weekly on Wednesdays during the 10 PM time slot. On January 10, 2019, it was announced that the series would premiere as a special "preview" on February 24, 2019, following the 91st Academy Awards and late local newscasts before premiering in its regular timeslot three days later.

ABC did not renew Whiskey Cavalier for a second season, with the network citing declining ratings as a factor. Its distributor, Warner Bros. Television, stated that it planned to shop the series to other networks. After the announcement, a campaign to save the series emerged on social media, which Deadline Hollywood compared to a similar campaign surrounding NBC's Timeless (which was cancelled, but renewed for a second season under similar circumstances). However,  Live in Front of a Studio Audience. On May 23, 2019, it was reported that ABC was "re-evaluating" a possible renewal based on these developments. However, showrunner David Hemingson stated on Twitter the next day that ABC would not reverse its decision.

Reception

Ratings

Critical response
On review aggregator Rotten Tomatoes, the series holds an approval rating of 85% based on 33 reviews, with an average rating of 6.09/10. The website's critical consensus reads, "Fun, feisty, and fueled by the chemistry between its charismatic leads, Whiskey Cavalier overcomes its familiar structure to deliver an attractive take on a well-worn formula." On Metacritic, it has a weighted average score of 64 out of 100, based on 16 critics, indicating "generally favorable reviews".

Notes

References

External links

Whiskey Cavalier official website

2010s American comedy-drama television series
2019 American television series debuts
2019 American television series endings
American action television series
American Broadcasting Company original programming
English-language television shows
Television series by Warner Bros. Television Studios